The Federazione Italiana Attività Subacquee (FIAS) (Italian Underwater Activities Federation) is an Italian non-profit diver training organization. It is a member of:
CMAS (Confédération Mondiale des Activités Subaquatiques)
EUF (European Underwater Federation)
CIAS (Confederazione Italiana delle Attività Subacquee).

It counts in Italy 130 distinct federated clubs (34 sezioni territoriali and 96 circoli).

History
It was founded as ENAL-FIAS in 1968, then changed in FIAS in 1972.

Activities

Courses and diver certifications
FIAS offers internationally recognized (CMAS) diver certifications.

Most relevant courses
Base - 20m, air (CMAS *)
ARA - 30m, air (CMAS **)
ARA Estensione - 40m, air, decompression diving (CMAS ***)
Nitrox - Nitrox diving
IAA 1 - 50m, air
IAA 2 - 60m, air
Trimix 62 - 62m, normoxic Trimix

EUF Certification
The FIAS obtained CEN certification from the EUF certification body in 2005 for the following scuba diver grades:
 Base certified to EN 14153-2/ISO 24801-2
 Diving Guide certified to EN 14153-3/ISO 24801-3
 Trainee Instructor certified to EN 14153-3/ISO 24801-3
 Federal Instructor certified to EN 14153-3/ISO 24801-3
The EUF register number is EUF CB 2005004.

Other activities
It works alongside Italian Civil Protection and actively supports environment research and protection projects like the MAC project for the coastal environmental monitoring.

References

External links
 Official website

Underwater diving training organizations